The Arisaig Group is a geologic group in Nova Scotia. It preserves fossils dating back to the Silurian period.

See also

 List of fossiliferous stratigraphic units in Nova Scotia

References
 

Silurian Nova Scotia